The K V class was a class of three submarines, built by Fijenoord shipyard in Rotterdam for the Royal Netherlands Navy. Used for patrols in the Dutch colonial waters. Only K VII was still in service at the start of World War II. She was bombed by the Japanese in the harbour of Soerabaja.

Construction

External links
Description of class